Gwersyllt railway station serves the area of Gwersyllt in the city of Wrexham in North Wales. It is one of five stations  in the Wrexham County Borough.

The station is 3.5 km (2¼ miles) north of Wrexham Central on the Borderlands Line and was opened in 1866. The station used to have a signal box at the northern end of the Bidston-bound platform. A short distance to the south a goods-only branch line (part of the North Wales Mineral Railway network, to Brymbo) crossed the route and the abutments of the bridge it utilised still survive (along with a dip in the track formation). One of the line's main engineering features, the five arch stone viaduct over the River Cegidog is situated on this stretch of the line, but to the north of the station.

Facilities
The station is unstaffed and has no ticket provision (these must be bought on the train or prior to travel). Amenities provided here are limited to waiting shelters (there being no other permanent structures left here), CIS displays and timetable poster boards. There is a car park behind the northbound platform, which adjoins that belonging to a local supermarket. Level access can be had from there to both platforms, though the southbound one requires the use of a barrow crossing. Access is also possible to both platforms from the road bridge at the south end, though this has steps on both sides.

Services
Weekdays (daytime) the line is served by two units, providing an hourly service each way (southbound to Wrexham Central and northbound to Bidston). After 18:45 (and all day on bank holidays) the service is provided by one unit, giving one train in each direction every two hours.

On Sundays the service is roughly every 90 minutes.

Gallery

References

Sources

External links

Railway stations in Wrexham County Borough
DfT Category F2 stations
Former Great Central Railway stations
Railway stations in Great Britain opened in 1886
Railway stations served by Transport for Wales Rail